The Team sprint large hill/2 × 7.5 km was held on 2 March 2013.

Ski jumping
The ski jumping was started at 10:00.

Cross-country skiing
The Cross-country skiing was started at 15:00.

References

FIS Nordic World Ski Championships 2013